Wallsend is a place in England.

Wallsend may also refer to:

 Electoral district of Wallsend
 Wallsend (UK Parliament constituency)
 Wallsend, Kentucky, unincorporated community
 Wallsend, New South Wales, suburb of Newcastle
 Wallsend, New Zealand, a locality
 SS Wallsend, various ships